Lathyrus cicera is a species of wild pea known by the common names red pea, red vetchling and flatpod peavine. It is native to Europe, North Africa, and the Middle East, and it is known from other places as an introduced species. This is a hairless annual herb producing a slightly winged stem. They also bear branched, curling tendrils. The fruit is a hairless dehiscent legume pod.

This is one pea species known to cause lathyrism; nevertheless, as cicerchia it figured among the comestibles enjoyed by the fortunate Milanese, listed at length by Bonvesin de la Riva in his "Marvels of Milan" (1288).

References

External links
Jepson Manual Treatment

Photo gallery

cicera
Plants described in 1753
Taxa named by Carl Linnaeus
Flora of Europe
Flora of North Africa